Joe Hernandez was the voice of Santa Anita Park in Arcadia, California, from the time the track opened on Christmas Day 1934 until he fainted at the microphone on January 27, 1972. It was reported 28 February 2016 on the TVG horseracing channel that Hernandez had been kicked by a horse earlier and died while calling a race at Santa Anita Park. During that time, he called 15,587 races in a row.  Over the course of his career, his cry of "There they go!" echoed over a number of notable races including Seabiscuit’s win in the 1940 Santa Anita Handicap and Johnny Longden’s last ride in 1966.  His cries of "And here comes Malicious!" and "Silky Sullivan trails …" are remembered to this day.

Hernandez broke into the business of race calling in 1927 for Agua Caliente Racetrack at Tijuana, being developed by the first-ever race caller, Steward George Schilling, who on 5 February 1927 called the first race at the Mexican track. In 1932, he became the first race caller at Tanforan. In the coming years, he became the premiere race caller on the West Coast, at a time when most Mexicans and Mexican Americans were being repatriated to Mexico due to America's Great Depression. In the late 1930s, Alfred Vanderbilt, Jr. hired Hernandez to call the races at Pimlico Race Course and Belmont Park. While there, Hernandez encountered some discrimination when he was seen in public with his wife Pearl, an Anglo-American. In 1950, Hernandez called the Kentucky Derby for fans at Churchill Downs. A recording of his call was later distributed to over 60,000 racing fans.

Hernandez was not only a race caller; he was a highly respected sportswriter, handicapper, jockey and buyers agent, radio and television producer, music composer, actor, athlete, and philanthropist. He also owned a number of businesses related to horse racing. For example, he owned his own film patrol company (a company that recorded races in order to determine if a foul was committed during a race). Hernandez also imported, owned, and raced Thoroughbreds under his own silks. The most noted race horse to run under his colors was Cougar II, a Chilean import who was inaugurated into Thoroughbred horse racing's Hall of Fame in 2006.

A bronze bust of Hernandez was unveiled at Santa Anita on December 26, 1974. The piece rests at the bottom of the track's main grandstand entrance. Santa Anita track officials decided to place the piece here so Hernandez could be close to his fans, and they to him. As Rudolph Alvarado noted in his biography on Hernandez (The Untold Story of Joe Hernandez: The Voice of Santa Anita), "From here the bust would also serve to introduce Joe, and what he meant to Santa Anita to future racing fans. Most importantly, placed here, Joe’s gaze would always fall on his beloved Santa Anita."

References

External links

American sports announcers
American sportspeople of Mexican descent
American horse racing announcers
20th-century American male actors
People from Arcadia, California
American male actors of Mexican descent